Peter Strauss (born 1947) is an American television and movie actor.

Peter Strauss may also refer to:

 Peter L. Strauss (born 1940), Columbia Law School professor
 Peter Strauss Ranch, Santa Monica mountains

See also
 R. Peter Straus (1923–2012), American media proprietor